Season 1999–2000 was Hibs' first season back in the top flight of Scottish football, the newly founded Scottish Premier League, after gaining promotion from the First Division in 1999. Hibs re-established themselves well in the top flight, finishing in sixth place. The club also had a good Scottish Cup run, but were disappointingly beaten 2–1 by Aberdeen, who finished bottom of the SPL, in the semi-final at Hampden Park. The season was also memorable for Hibs fans due to a 3–0 win in the "Millennium derby" against Hearts. There was a landmark day towards the end of the season, as the last game on the Easter Road slope was played.

League season

Results

Final table

Scottish League Cup

As a club newly promoted to the SPL, Hibs entered at the second round stage of the competition, in which they defeated Clyde in a penalty shootout. This win sent Hibs through to a third round match against Kilmarnock at Rugby Park. In that match, Hibs conceded two early goals, and despite efforts by Pat McGinlay and Kenny Miller, Kilmarnock ran out 3–2 winners.

Results

Scottish Cup

Results

Transfers

Players In

Players Out

Loans In

Loans Out

Player stats

During the 1999–2000 season, Hibs used 29 different players in competitive games. The table below shows the number of appearances and goals scored by each player.

|}

See also
List of Hibernian F.C. seasons

Notes

External links
Hibernian 1999/2000 results and fixtures, Soccerbase

Hibernian F.C. seasons
Hibernian